A registered psychiatric nurse (RPN) specialises in a field of nursing that focuses on the mental health of patients. Psychiatric nurses assist the interdisciplinary team in the assessment and treatment of the patient's psychiatric illness and symptoms. They treat a variety of mental health disorders such as bipolar, depression, schizophrenia, anxiety, substance abuse addiction and eating disorders such as bulimia and anorexia. However, they do not diagnose the patient, this is the responsibility of a qualified psychologist or a psychiatric doctor. Psychiatric nurses are in charge of dispensing medication and the overall care of patients. Registered psychiatric nurses work under the supervision of doctors’ and they practice within the health care industry, mostly in mental health clinics, outpatient facilities, mental health agencies, long-term care centres or hospitals.

History

Australia 
Mental health in Australia was historically seen as an individual having ‘’bad blood’’, being possessed, or having a weakened disposition rather than an actual medical condition. Mental health was therefore, treated with in-patient care by a psychiatric nurse in a mental health facility. This was because there was no known way to treat this until anti-psychotic drugs were invented in the 1950s. Psychiatrists and psychiatric nurses were then able to manage the mental illnesses of patients through these new anti-psychotic drugs and through psychiatric remedial therapy. This in turn, shifted patients from custodial in hospital treatment to assisting patients in the community.

New Zealand 
Psychiatric nursing in New Zealand originated in prisons. However, from 1850, psychiatric patients were then treated in mental asylums. At first, non-qualified supervisors had the authority to assess and treat any patients. The New Zealand approach for psychiatric care of patients in mental asylums then adopted the structure of the British mental health system. In 1905, under the Mental Hygiene Division of the Department of Health, psychiatric nursing training commenced. By 1948, registration of psychiatric nursing became recognised by the Nurses’ and Midwives’ Board. The history of care between psychiatric patient and psychiatric nurse morphed from a physical care to more of a personal and interactive relationship.

America 
The inpatient model in the United States before the 1950s was considered the most effective way of treating mental illnesses. However, there was a push for de-institutionalisation as there was a belief that patients would receive better care outside of these psychiatric hospitals. By the 1960s many patients were moved from the hospitals to local facilities or mental health homes where they received personalised care by qualified psychiatric nurses. The number of institutionalised mentally ill patients fell from 560,000 in the 1950s to 130,000 by 1980.

Finland 
Finland built its biggest hospitals during the 1920s and 30s. From the start, psychiatric nurses were the primary staff responsible for the care of the mentally ill. The treatment in Finland was mostly institutionalised and during the 1970s, more psychiatric hospitals were being built and psychiatric nurses remained the biggest group within these facilities.

Ireland 
In 1833, one of the first mental hospitals, which were called lunatic asylums at the time was established in Ballinasloe. There were no significant differences between a general nurse and a psychiatric one, they both provided care to their patients.  However, psychiatric nursing roles were typically untrained and were former patients themselves in these asylums. Once their treatment was fulfilled, they were allowed to stay and continue to deliver care to other patients in these institutions.  These origins made psychiatric nursing less respected and had a substandard reputation, this was until Florence Nightingale’s professional treatment of patients became the gold standard for nursing. As nursing in general became more professionalised by the skills and training they were now required to have, psychiatric nursing, however, still had a stigma of being seen as an inferior field of nursing. As time went on, training became an important part of psychiatric nursing and it allowed these nurses to specialise in the treatment of mental illnesses. In Ireland today, psychiatric nursing is seen as a more respected career choice and are essentially intermediaries between patient and doctor with both sides depending on a trusting relationship to accurately treat a patient’s mental illness.

Psychiatric treatments

Non-medical treatment 
Registered psychiatric nursing focuses on the mind and the issues associated with the psychological state of a patient, such as mental illnesses from genetic traits; childhood trauma, and lifestyle influenced mental conditions, for example, drug induced psychosis. This is different to a general nurse because physical illnesses of patients are welcoming of treatments, while mental illness patients tend to be more defiant, thus initial treatment will rely on the trust between a patient, nurse and their doctor.

Psychiatric nurses are trained to ask patients relevant questions to ascertain what condition they may have, and they may also talk to relatives and friends. This is the primary tool for a psychiatric nurse in working out what treatment is appropriate. Listening to a patient is also important because they will divulge information about themselves while talking and this is useful to form a treatment strategy, such as how the patient reacts to certain events, how prone they are to suffering psychiatric episodes and which family members they trust who will be useful to contact in order to help with future treatment.

Medication 
Registered psychiatric nurses need patients to comply with the instructions of the psychiatric team to help get the necessary medication dispensed to them. Mental health illnesses are conditions that will most likely need ongoing treatment for the rest of the patients’ lives, thus it is pertinent to know what treatment is best for each individual patient. Concordance is a treatment strategy between the doctor, psychiatric nurse and the patient to discuss the treatment that they will be receiving and what they want as the outcome. That is why communication and having a personable relationship with the patient can help administer the necessary medication. Poor concordance, however, will affect the patient in a negative way. Patients with mental health issues that lack a strong concordance with their psychiatric nurse can have a distrust of these medication and in the consequence will be refusing to comply with treatment. For example, it was shown that 74 per cent of patients with schizophrenia stop taking the medication within 18 months of their first treatment. Other reasons why patients may refuse treatment is cultural differences such as some cultures believing mental health is not a health issue but may be a form of witchcraft or being possessed by evil spirits. These issues can be fixed with better communication between psychiatric nurse and patient.

Treatment with comorbid physical illnesses 
Treatment of a mental health condition with a pre-existing physical medical illness can be challenging. A psychiatric nurse will need to be aware of this illness or illnesses because a psychiatric nurse and doctor needs to be cautious when prescribing medication. Prescribing the right medication is important because it can have an adverse effect on the patient. Some of the conditions that are known to affect mixing of medications are:

Diabetes 
There are two different types of diabetes. Type 1 diabetes is where the pancreas does not have the ability to produce any insulin. Whereas type 2 diabetes is a condition where there is a reduced sensitivity to insulin. An example of how it affects the patient is that psychotropic medications will generally have a side effect of weight gain. It is important for people, especially people with type 2 diabetes to have control over their weight.  It is also shown that psychotropic medication is known to have links to impaired glucose metabolism thus prescribing the right medication and dose is essential to have all medications working how they are prescribed. Psychiatric nurses need to be aware that chronic conditions such as diabetes can only be managed with a mental illness if there is a combination of self-management with the patient and monitoring by the psychiatric nurse.

Coronary heart disease 
Psychiatric medications can affect the rhythm of the heart, so people who have a pre-existing heart condition need to have the psychiatric nurse aware of this issue before administering of any psychiatric medications. An electrocardiogram can help detect a heart condition prior to dispensing of psychiatric drug. So, patients need to have the psychiatric nurse aware of any heart problems, so precautions can be taken.

Respiratory conditions 
Asthma is a respiratory condition that people who struggle with mental health may neglect and if they do not attend to this, the condition will worsen and sometimes may be fatal. Psychiatric nurses are important to frequently monitor symptoms and encourage the use of asthma related medications such as inhalers.

Smoking is a habit that will exacerbate chronic respiratory conditions, and this will increase the patient’s susceptibility in developing infections. Psychiatric nurses will need to observe patients whenever there are signs of respiratory illnesses because psychiatric medications can decrease the respiratory rate of patients and in some cases reduces the effectiveness of the doses.

Liver and kidney disorders 
Liver and kidney problems tend to occur either with alcohol and drugs being abused, or when an individual has a genetic liver problem. People that have a mental health issue tend to misuse alcohol and drugs as a coping mechanism. A study found that ten per cent of psychiatric patients that are prescribed antipsychotic medication have livers that are impaired and not functioning at full capacity. For psychiatric nurses, they need to be aware that some diseases that are liver related might not show in initial liver scans, so they need to be knowledgeable of certain medications that have the potential to further damage the kidney or the liver. An example of this is lithium, this medication can significantly damage an organ, even if it is a minor impairment.

Education

Australia 
A psychiatric nurse would have needed to complete an undergraduate degree; this will allow for practice in most mental health settings. After graduation they must apply to Australian Health Practitioner Regulation Agency (AHPRA) to practice as a registered nurse. However, further studying in mental health may be needed to specialise in psychiatric nursing.

New Zealand 
The New Zealand requirements to work as a qualified psychiatric nurse is a postgraduate certificate in Health Sciences specialising in Mental Health Nursing. This certificate can be attained if the entry requirements have been satisfied, which is an undergraduate degree at either a recognised university or an institution that offers a degree within a health sciences discipline such as nursing, social work, pharmacy and so forth. A current registration with the Nursing Council in New Zealand is also a requirement

United States 
Prospective psychiatric nurses must study a degree in nursing, then a masters or doctorate specialising in psychiatric nursing. The master’s program covers all aspects of psychiatric nursing, including but not limited to psychotherapy and prescription and management of psychotropic medications.

Britain 
In Britain, a Bachelor of Nursing will be required and the completion of the National Council Licensure Examination for Registered Nurses (NCLEX-RN) will allow a person to work as a general nurse.  However, to specialise in psychiatric nursing further studying to attain a master’s degree in mental health will be needed.

South Africa 
To qualify as a psychiatric nurse in South Africa, a 4-year nursing science diploma at a recognised nursing college will then open up the possibility for further training in mental health, with a postgraduate degree specialising in Psychiatric Nursing Science. Also, registration with the South African Nursing Council will certify an individual wanting to pursue a career in psychiatric nursing.

See also
 Licensed practical nurse
 Psychiatric and mental health nursing
 Registered nurse

References

External links
 Registered Psychiatric Nurses of Canada’s Web site
 College of Registered Psychiatric Nurses of Alberta
 College of Registered Psychiatric Nurses of British Columbia
 College of Registered Psychiatric Nurses of Manitoba
 Registered Psychiatric Nurses' Association of Saskatchewan
 American Psychiatric Nurses Association

Psychiatric nursing